The periosteum is a membrane that covers the outer surface of all bones, except at the articular surfaces (i.e. the parts within a joint space) of long bones. Endosteum lines the inner surface of the medullary cavity of all long bones.

Structure

The periosteum consists of an outer fibrous layer, and an inner cambium layer (or osteogenic layer). The fibrous layer is of dense irregular connective tissue, containing fibroblasts, while the cambium layer is highly cellular containing progenitor cells that develop into osteoblasts. These osteoblasts are responsible for increasing the width of a long bone and the overall size of the other bone types. After a bone fracture, the progenitor cells develop into osteoblasts and chondroblasts, which are essential to the healing process. The outer fibrous layer and the inner cambium layer is differentiated under electron micrography.

As opposed to osseous tissue, the periosteum has nociceptors, sensory neurons that make it very sensitive to manipulation. It also provides nourishment by providing the blood supply to the body from the marrow. The periosteum is attached to the bone by strong collagen fibers called Sharpey's fibres, which extend to the outer circumferential and interstitial lamellae. It also provides an attachment for muscles and tendons.

The periosteum that covers the outer surface of the bones of the skull is known as the pericranium, except when in reference to the layers of the scalp.

History
The word periosteum is derived from the Greek peri-, meaning "surrounding", and -osteon, meaning "bone". The peri refers to the fact that the periosteum is the outermost layer of long bones, surrounding other inner layers.

Additional images

See also
 Periosteal reaction
 Periostitis
 Endochondral ossification
 Intramembranous ossification

Notes

References

Further reading

External links

Skeletal system